The Middle of Everywhere: 25th Anniversary Tour (also known as the Middle of Everywhere Tour) is the fourteenth concert tour by American band Hanson. The tour is a celebration to mark when the band formed in 1992. Beginning June 2017, the tour visited Europe, Australasia and the Americas.

Background
The tour was first mentioned in 2016 while the band was creating their eleventh EP, Play. Taylor Hanson stated their plans were to release the EP and to begin a worldwide tour in 2017. The tour was officially announced in March 2017. The band went on a media junket to promote the tour and to discuss the milestones: the 25th anniversary of the band's formation and the 20th anniversary of their debut studio album. While on tour, Taylor plans to host and deejay at an after party, "Dance Like You Don’t Care", featuring a mix of modern and 90's music.

The band also announced plans to release a greatest hits album, Middle Of Everywhere—The Greatest Hits, late in 2017.

Alongside promoting the tour, the band also announced they would headlined the "Hop Jam Beer and Music Festival" in Tulsa, Oklahoma. The band are co-creators of the music festival but this year marks the first time they have headlined the event. Following their performance, the band released the single, "I Was Born".

The band also announced appearances at the 2017 edition of Summerfest and the Eat to the Beat Concert Series.

Opening act
Lewis Watson

Setlist
The following setlist was obtained from the concert held on June 5, 2017; at La Cigale in Paris, France. It does not represent all concerts during the tour.
"Already Home"
"Waiting for This"
"Where's the Love"
"Look at You"
"Tragic Symphony"
"Thinking 'bout Somethin'"
"Been There Before"
"This Time Around"
"Weird"
"Go"
"Madeline"
"Juliet"
"Strong Enough to Break"
"Penny & Me"
"Watch Over Me"
"With You in Your Dreams"
"On and On"
"I Was Born"
"A Minute Without You"
"Get the Girl Back"
"I'm a Man" / "Gimme Some Lovin'" / "Long Train Runnin'"
"MMMBop"
"If Only"
"Fired Up"
"In the City"
Encore
Rockin' Robin" / "Johnny B. Goode"
"Lost Without Each Other"

Tour dates

Box office score data

References

2017 concert tours
Hanson (band)